The Pneumatic Institution (also referred to as Pneumatic Institute) was a medical research facility in Bristol, England, in 1799–1802. It was established by physician and science writer Thomas Beddoes to study the medical effects of gases, known as factitious airs, that had recently been discovered. Humphry Davy headed the Institution's laboratory, examining the effects of laughing gas on himself and others, and James Watt designed much of the lab's equipment.

History

Preliminaries
After Lavoisier had established the role of oxygen in animal respiration, members of the Lunar Society, such as Joseph Priestley (who had co-discovered oxygen), originated pneumatic chemistry, which eventually led to the establishment of the Pneumatic Institution.

Georgiana, Duchess of Devonshire, who was unusually educated about Chemistry, visited Thomas Beddoes in his laboratory in Hope Square, Bristol, in December 1793. He had set it up earlier that year to study possible medical uses of the recently discovered gases. During her second, extended, visit, "the idea of replacing the existing outpatient facility with a hospital—a Medical Pneumatic Institution—was first formulated." In 1794, she tried to persuade Sir Joseph Banks, who was President of the Royal Society of London at the time, to lend support to Beddoes' efforts. Banks refused, citing scientific objections in addition to his political concerns about Beddoes' sympathising with the French revolution. Even a supporting request from Watt did not change Banks' mind.

Establishment

Beddoes had moved from Oxford in 1793 and established himself as a physician. He moved to the Hotwells area of Bristol where many sufferers from tuberculosis were gathered in the hope of a cure. By 1794 Beddoes had arranged for the manufacture of suitable apparatus by the firm of Boulton and Watt and the first of the "pneumatic patients" was a Mr Knight of Painswick, whom Beddoes treated with "unrespirable airs" for a deep-seated ulcer of the pelvis. By 5 March 1795 Beddoes was reporting successful treatment of paralytic patients and ordering an apparatus and oxygen for a Mr Gladwell in Clifton.

Between 1792 and 1798, Beddoes had collected and published many "case histories" sent to him by other sympathetic physicians, from many parts of the country, and principally concerning the inhalation of oxygen and hydrogen.

In November 1798, Beddoes rented two buildings at 6 and 7 Dowry Square, in Hotwells, and in March 1799 the laboratory was moved into the smaller one and the Institution was publicly announced. Beddoes anticipated that scientific investigations and medical treatment would be carried out side by side.

Humphry Davy's experiments
In March 1798, the curiosity of Humphry Davy was aroused by dramatic statements made in Samuel Latham Mitchell's Remarks on the gaseous oxyd of nitrogen and its effects (1795) that nitrous oxide had disastrous effects whether inhaled or in
contact with the skin, that it was indeed the very "principle of contagion".

Davy joined the Pneumatic Institution in 1798 as the laboratory operator, largely through the recommendation of Davies Giddy, and it was here that he undertook experiments that included himself inhaling nitrous oxide, which he called laughing gas for its effects. Davy was to describe his work at the Institution in his Researches, chemical and philosophical, chiefly concerning nitrous oxide, or dephlogisticated nitrous air, and its respiration (London, Murray, 1800).

This and other gases were administered, without charge, to willing subjects, particularly those with diseases considered to be incurable at the time. Although the initial aim had been to treat patients with tuberculosis, most of the patients treated suffered from some form of paralysis.

James Watt's involvement

James Watt supported the Institution because conventional methods had failed to help against his son's pulmonary tuberculosis (known as consumption at the time), which had previously claimed his daughter Jessie.

In the last days of Jessie Watt's illness, on the advice of Erasmus Darwin, Beddoes had been called in to administer his new respiratory treatment and, although lacking suitable apparatus, had arranged for the girl to breathe "fixt air" (carbon dioxide). The treatment, not surprisingly, had no beneficial effect and Watt's daughter died.

Watt designed many of the apparatuses and techniques necessary to produce and administer various gases.

Disestablishment and legacy
The Pneumatic Institution was converted into a normal hospital when typhus broke out in Bristol in 1800. Davy left in 1801 to join Sir Joseph at the Royal Institution. The Bristol Pneumatic Institution closed down in 1802. Many of the techniques and tools developed by Watt for the Pneumatic Institution are still used in modern medicine.

References

Further reading

Scientific societies based in the United Kingdom
Medical associations based in the United Kingdom
Laboratories in the United Kingdom
Organizations established in 1799
1799 establishments in England
1802 disestablishments in England
18th century in Bristol
19th century in Bristol